Steve David Perry (born 1969) is an American educator, author, and TV personality. He became well known when CNN Black in America featured a story on him and the school he founded, Capital Preparatory School in Hartford, Ct. He is also known for appearing on Iyanla: Fix My Life.

Perry has previously hosted talk shows such as Breakthrough With Dr. Steve Perry and Save My Son. He has also worked as a columnist for Essence.

Biography
Perry was raised in Middletown, Connecticut. His family is of mixed ancestry, Caucasian mother and African-American father.

In 1998, he founded ConnCAP at Capital Community College, a Connecticut collegiate awareness program.

In 2005, he founded his first school, Capital Prep Magnet School, Hartford, Connecticut, as part of his chain, Capital Preparatory Schools. In 2015, second school named, Capital Prep Harbor School, was opened in Bridgeport, Connecticut. Another school, Capital Prep Harlem School, was opened in 2016 in partnership with Diddy. A year later, Capital Prep Harbor Lower School in Bridgeport, Connecticut opened its doors In 2020, his fifth school campus opened in the Bronx, New York. It is the third school which was opened in partnership with Diddy.

In 2011, his book, Push Has Come to Shove, was published.

In 2016, he contributed in Steve Harvey's book, Jump: Take the Leap of Faith to Achieve Your Life of Abundance.

In 2018, his talk show, Breakthrough With Dr. Steve Perry, started to air on Fox Stations and CBS network.

Perry was part of CNN's documentary Black in America. He has reported for Anderson Cooper 360 and American Morning through his reportage, Perry's Principles. He is also an education advisor to Oprah Winfrey.

Books
 Perry, Steve (2006). Man Up! Nobody is Coming to Save Us
 Perry, Steve (2011). Push Has Come to Shove

References

Living people
African-American writers
1969 births
African-American educators
American people of European descent